Richard Remick Smothers (born November 20, 1938) is an American actor, comedian, composer, and musician. He was half of the musical comedy team the Smothers Brothers, with his older brother Tom.

Life and career
Smothers was born in New York City in 1938, the son of Ruth (née Remick), a homemaker, and Thomas B. Smothers, an Army officer who died as a prisoner of war, of the Japanese, in April 1945. After moving to Southern California, Dick attended Verdugo Hills High School in Tujunga, California, and graduated from Redondo Union High School in Redondo Beach, California, and later attended San José State University, then called San José State College.  At SJSC, Smothers participated as a distance runner for the track team (coached by Lloyd (Bud) Winter).

The Smothers Brothers appeared on numerous television shows, including two shows of their own: The Smothers Brothers Show, a sitcom from 1965 to 1966; and The Smothers Brothers Comedy Hour, a variety show in 1967. In 1977, he appeared twice as a panelist on the daytime TV game show Match Game. In 1993, he played one of the characters on cartoon Christmas movie Precious Moments: Timmy's Special Delivery. Without Tom, he also appeared in the 1995 Martin Scorsese-directed film Casino in an uncharacteristically serious role as a dishonest Nevada State Senator. His character and the dialogue in one scene was partly based on the career of former United States Senator Harry Reid, who once chaired the Nevada Gaming Commission.

In December 2009, Dick and Tom both guest starred in a 21st-season episode of The Simpsons that also featured Cooper, Peyton and Eli Manning.

In February 2010, Smothers filed for Chapter 11 bankruptcy protection. In May, he and his brother announced their retirement from touring.

Smothers has been active in amateur automobile racing, both road racing and drag racing. He is the father of six children: Dick Jr., Andrew, Steven, Sarah, Susan, and Remick. He currently resides in upstate New York. In September 2022, Smothers married Marie Navarroli Kropp.

On the December 11, 2022, episode of CBS News Sunday Morning, the brothers announced that they would be going on tour in 2023.

Filmography

References

External links

 

1938 births
American sketch comedians
American comedy musicians
American male composers
21st-century American composers
Television personalities from California
Living people
Actors from Redondo Beach, California
Musicians from New York City
San Jose State University alumni
24 Hours of Le Mans drivers
Racing drivers from New York City
Musicians from Redondo Beach, California
World Sportscar Championship drivers
American male television actors
American male film actors
Comedians from California
20th-century American comedians
21st-century American male musicians